Amerongen Castle (Dutch: Kasteel Amerongen) is a castle in Amerongen, Utrechtse Heuvelrug, Netherlands. It was built between 1674 and 1680, on the site of a medieval castle that had been burned down by the French in 1673. The gardens still contain historic elements such as a conservatory dating from the 1890s. In 1918, the former German Kaiser Wilhelm II signed his abdication here and stayed till 1920, when he moved to Huis Doorn.

History
The current building was designed by the architect Maurits Post as a baroque palace for the owners Godard Adriaan van Reede and his wife Margaretha Turnor. In the main hall a central staircase with painted ceiling was built by Willem van Nimwegen. Other ornaments were added in the early 20th century by P.J.H. Cuypers. The gardens contain historical elements and the walls predate 1673. Near the entrance bridge dating from 1678 is a wooden clock tower from 1728 that contains the original clock of the same date. In the northeast corner of the gardens is an orangerie dating from the 1880s; the north wall was raised during the period when Wilhelm II was residing there 1918–1920. He abdicated in Amerongen then moved to Huis Doorn.

Video installation

From 2002 to 2011 the castle was restored as a partnership between the Rijksdienst voor het Cultureel Erfgoed and various funds in the cultural heritage sector. To celebrate the completion of the restoration activities, a video installation by Saskia Boddeke and Peter Greenaway was presented to visitors at the castle from July 1, 2011, to June 21, 2012. Through sophisticated video projections visitors are taken back in time to 21 June 1680. In 37 minutes the story is told on 21 different screens throughout the castle. The castle functions today as a museum and is open from 11 to 5 PM from Thursday to Sunday.

Cast

 Margaretha Turnor — Anneke Blok
 Godard Adriaan van Reede — Gijs Scholten van Aschat
 Godard van Ginckel — Francis Broekhuijsen
 Sanne van Wierix — Maartje Teussink
 Gideon Momper — Fabian Jansen
 Oulder Bogarde — Hendrik Aerts
 Nelleke Trappen — Kitty Courbois
 Cor Brakel — Tim Assen
 Sophie Visbach — Sylvia Poorta
 Stefana Tromper — Chris Nietvelt
 Sara Boon — Lotje van Lunteren
 Hendrickje Boon — Zoë Sterre Greenaway
 Bart Boon — Piet Veenstra
 Ans Heiden — Sytske van der Ster
 Greet Heiden — Femke van der Ster
 Clara Bosch — Lotte Schmidt
 Lise de Vries — Sofieke de Kater
 Sakky Saskia Boskie — Sarah Jonker
 Johan Leiderdorp — Hendrik Aerts
 Thomas Vrax — Kes Blans
 Frederick Volkers — Derk Stenvers
 Thomas Cotinis — Hubert Fermin
 Evelien Cotinis — Lotte Schmidt
 Hans Blok — Iwan Walhain
 Femke Blok — Rikke Rasmussen Mechlenborg
 Gillis Codde — Jan Rot
 Marie Tilburg — Elisa Somsen
 Lydia Smulders — Rikke Rasmussen Mechlenborg
 Gesina Pardel — Lotte Schmidt
 Ruud Molester — Iwan Walhain
 Jos Houlderkircher — Sjaak Hartog
 Clementina van der Loo — Renee van Beek
 Ensign Gerard van Broeder — Lodewijk Gerretsen
 Douwe van Driel — Oscar Wagenmans
 Crispijn van der Visscher — Hendrik Aerts
 Carol de Graff — Frans de Wit
 Abraham Issacs — Laus Steenbeeke
 Zacharias van Uylenburg — Laus Steenbeeke
 Godfried Trip — Jochum ten Haaf
 Aleida (van) Wouters — Eva Damen
 Commodius Hermstede — Adrian Brine
 Osip Barouschka — Roger Smeets
 Jean-Baptiste Becampen — Gerard Lemaître
 Ekke Knolle — David de Vriend
 Herman Geelvinck —  Jon Marrée

Aerial view

References

External links
 Stichting Kasteel Amerongen website
 Trailer: A day in the life of Castle Amerongen - 1680, YouTube
 Trailer

Buildings and structures completed in 1672
Historic house museums in the Netherlands
Castles in Utrecht (province)
Rijksmonuments in Utrecht (province)
Utrechtse Heuvelrug
Dutch avant-garde and experimental films
Films directed by Peter Greenaway
1680 establishments in the Dutch Republic